Denys Ovsyannikov (born 10 December 1984) is a Ukrainian futsal player who plays for Energy Lviv and the Ukraine national futsal team.

References

External links
UEFA profile

1984 births
Living people
Ukrainian men's futsal players
SK Energia Lviv players